Live: Walmart Soundcheck may refer to:

 Live: Walmart Soundcheck (Demi Lovato album)
 Live: Walmart Soundcheck (Jonas Brothers album)